İrfan Buz (born 15 April 1967) is a Turkish football manager and former player.

Professional career
Buz moved to Germany in 1971 with his family, and graduated as a construction technician from the Technical University of Dortmund. He began playing amateur football with Rot-Weiß Lüdenscheid, before playing professional in Turkey. Buz joined Sarıyer S.K. in the Süper Lig in 1989, but only made 1 appearance over 2 years.

Managerial career
After his footballing career, Buz began working as a football manager. He transitioned as player manager for the amateur German club Barışspor Hackenberg. From 1999-2008, he served a youth coach in for the German Football Association. He managed the German club SpVg Olpe from 2009 to 2013 and got attention from the Turkish Süper Lig. In 2013 he briefly joined FC Iserlohn 46/49 before moving to Bursaspor.

Buz was appointed assistant coach of Bursaspor in 2013 and became the head coach on 26 March 2014. He then went to manage Gençlerbirliği on 23 September 2014. He then spent a couple years at Yeni Malatyaspor, who he helped promoted to the Süper Lig in his final season with them. In 2017, he became the manager of Osmanlıspor, who were relegated at the end of the season.

References

External links
 
 TFF Manager Profile
 
 Manager Profile

1967 births
Living people
Footballers from Istanbul
Turkish footballers
Turkish football managers
Turkish emigrants to Germany
Sarıyer S.K. footballers
Sakaryaspor footballers
Maltepespor footballers
Süper Lig players
TFF First League players
TFF Second League players
Bursaspor managers
Gençlerbirliği S.K. managers
Yeni Malatyaspor managers
Kasımpaşa S.K. managers
Süper Lig managers
Association football midfielders